Cooksville GO Station is a GO Transit train and bus station the Milton line in the community of Cooksville in Mississauga, Ontario, Canada. It is located at 3210 Hurontario Street, near Dundas and Hurontario Streets. The future Hurontario LRT will connect to this station.

Description
Like most GO stations, Cooksville has parking for commuters and a station building with a ticket sales agent and a waiting room. It is located near several condominium complexes, which provides ridership on the Milton Line. The 1400-space parking lot allows access to those who live closer to Mississauga City Centre to use the station.

The GO Station is served by seven trains inbound to Union Station in the morning rush hour and seven trains outbound to Milton during the evening rush hour. There is also the Train-Bus during off-peak hours.

Despite growing ridership on the Milton line, GO cannot schedule additional trains because of the busy Canadian Pacific Railway freight services running on the same tracks. Trains were extended from ten to twelve carriages in a phased roll-out between April 8, 2008 and May 2, 2008 in order to increase capacity, and congestion is alleviated somewhat by the extensive train-bus services outside of rush periods.

On October 13, 2008 the Canadian Pacific Spirit Train stopped at Cooksville GO station to promote the Vancouver 2010 Winter Olympics.

Repairs to the platforms and pedestrian tunnels began in October 2014 and was completed by the spring of 2015.

Reconstruction
Demolition of the original Cooksville GO station building and portions of the parking lot began in 2018 in preparation for the construction of new station structures. The new station includes a multi-level parking structure, improved pedestrian access, and a connection to the planned Hurontario LRT. Construction was completed on November 10, 2020, at a cost of $128.4 million.

Connecting buses
MiWay
2 Hurontario
4 Sherway Gardens
28 Confederation
38/38A Creditview
53 Kennedy
103 Hurontario Express
GO Transit
21 Milton/Toronto

References

External links

GO Transit railway stations
Galt Subdivision
Railway stations in Mississauga
Railway stations in Canada opened in 1981
1981 establishments in Ontario
Hurontario LRT